Mian Kuh (also Romanized as Mīān Kūh and Miyān Kūh) is a village in Mud Rural District, Mud District, Sarbisheh County, South Khorasan Province, Iran. At the 2006 census, its population was 37, in 13 families.

References 

Populated places in Sarbisheh County